Galuh Stadium (Stadion Galuh) is a multi-purpose stadium in the city of Ciamis, Indonesia. The stadium has a capacity of 20,000 people.

It is the home base of PSGC Ciamis.

References

Sports venues in Indonesia
Football venues in Indonesia